Taonga is a New Zealand documentary series about New Zealand art and artists that debuted in 2006.

References

2006 New Zealand television series debuts
New Zealand documentary television series
TVNZ original programming
Television shows funded by NZ on Air
Television series by Greenstone TV